Bartolomeo or Bartolommeo is a masculine Italian given name, the Italian equivalent of Bartholomew. Its diminutive form is Baccio. Notable people with the name include:

 Abramo Bartolommeo Massalongo (1824–1860), Italian paleobotanist and lichenologist
 Bartolomeo Aimo (1889–1970), Italian professional bicycle road racer
 Bartolomeo Altomonte, a.k.a. Bartholomäus Hohenberg (1694–1783), Austrian baroque painter
 Bartolomeo Amico a.k.a. Bartholomeus Amicus (1562–1649), Jesuit priest, teacher and writer who spent his adult life in Naples
 Bartolomeo Ammanati (1511–1592), Florentine architect and sculptor
 Bartolomeo Avanzini (1608–1658), Italian architect of the Baroque period
 Bartolomeo Bacilieri (1842–1923), Italian cardinal, Bishop of Verona 1900–1923
 Bartolommeo Bandinelli (1488–1560), Italian sculptor
 Bartolomeo Barbarino (c. 1568–c. 1617 or later), Italian composer and singer of the early Baroque era
 Bartolomeo Bassi (early 1600s-1640s), Genoese painter of the early Baroque period
 Bartolomeo Bellano a.k.a. Bartolomeo Vellano (c. 1437–c. 1496), Italian Renaissance sculptor and architect
 Bartolomeo Bimbi (1648–1723), Florentine painter of still lifes
 Bartolomeo Biscaino (1632–1657), Italian painter of the Baroque period, active in Genoa
 Bartolomeo Bon (d. after 1464), Italian sculptor and architect from Campione d’Italia
 Bartolomeo Borghesi (1781–1860), Italian antiquarian, key figure in establishing the science of numismatics
 Bartolomeo Campagnoli (1751–1827), Italian violinist and composer
 Bartolomeo Cappellari (1765–1846), Pope Gregory XVI (1831–46)
 Bartolomeo Carducci (1560–1608), Italian painter, better known as Carducho
 Bartolomeo Cavaceppi (1716–1799), Italian sculptor
 Bartolomeo Cavarozzi (c. 1590–1625), Italian painter of the Baroque period active in Spain
 Bartolomeo Cesi (1556–1629), Italian painter of the Baroque era of the Bolognese School
 Bartolomeo Colleoni (c. 1400–1475), Italian condottiero
 Bartolomeo Contarini (nobleman) (fl. mid-15th century), Venetian businessman, governor of the Duchy of Athens after marrying the widowed duchess
 Bartolomeo Contarini (naval commander), 17th-century commander of the Venetian and Papal fleets at the Battle of Andros in the Great Turkish War
 Bartolomeo Costantini (1889–1941), Italian aviator and racing car driver
 Bartolomeo Cristofori (1655–1731), Italian maker of musical instruments, generally regarded as the inventor of the piano
 Bartolomeo da Bologna (fl. 1405–1427), Italian composer of the early Quattrocento
 Bartolomeo d'Alviano (1455–1515), Italian condottiero and captain, fought in the defense of the Venetian Republic against the Holy Roman Emperor Maximilian
 Bartolomeo d'Aragona (fl. late 14th–early 15th centuries), Sicilian nobleman and statesman; defeated in a rebellion and exiled
 Bartolomeo degli Organi (1474–1539), Italian composer, singer, and organist of the Renaissance
Bartolomeo del Tintore (1459–1495), Italian manuscript illuminator
 Bartolomeo della Gatta (1448–1502), Florentine painter, illuminator, and architect
 Bartolomeo della Rocca (1467–1504), Bolognese scholar of chiromancy, physiognomy, and astrology
 Bartolomeo di Breganze(c. 1200–c. 1271), Italian prelate, bishop of Vicenza and founder of the Order of the Blessed Virgin Mary
 Bartolomeo di Cassino (fl. late 16th century), Italian painter active in the Mannerist period
 Bartolomeo di Giovanni (d. 1501), Florentine painter, worked under Sandro Botticelli
 Bartolomeo di Tommaso (fl. early 15th century), Italian painter
 Bartolomeo Eustachi a.k.a. Eustachius (c. 1500–1574), Italian anatomist, one of the founders of the science of human anatomy, eponym of the Eustachian tube
 Bartolomeo Facio (1400–1457), Italian historian, writer, and humanist
 Bartolomeo Gastaldi (1818–1879), Italian geologist and paleontologist, one of the founders of the Club Alpino Italiano
 Bartolomeo Ghetti (painter) (died 1536), Renaissance painter from Florence
 Bartolomeo Ghetti (sculptor) (died 1708), Baroque sculptor from Carrara
 Bartolomeo Giuseppe Guarneri a.k.a. Giuseppe Guarneri (1698–1744), Italian luthier from the Guarneri house of Cremona
 Bartolomeo Gradenigo (c. 1260–1342), 53rd doge of Venice 1339–1342
 Bartolomeo Guidobono a.k.a. il Prete di Savona or Prete Bartolomeo da Savona (1654–1709), Italian painter of the Baroque period
 Bartolomeo I della Scala (d. 1304), lord of Verona 1301–04
 Bartolomeo II della Scala (d. July 12, 1381), lord of Verona 1375–1381
 Bartolomeo Letterini (1669–after 1731), Venetian painter of the Baroque period
 Bartolomeo Manfredi (1582–1622), Italian painter, a leading member of the Caravaggisti
 Bartolomeo Maranta a.k.a. Bartholomaeus Marantha (c. 1500–1571), Venetian physician, botanist, and literary theorist
 Bartolomeo Marchionni (fl. late 15th–early 16th centuries), Florentine merchant established in Lisbon during the Age of Discovery
 Bartolomeo Mastri a.k.a. Bartholomew Mastrius (1602–1673), Italian Conventual Franciscan philosopher and theologian
 Bartolomeo Minio (fl. late 15th century), Venetian sea captain and commander (provveditor e capitanio) of Nauplion in the Venetian Morea
 Bartolomeo Montagna (c. 1450–1523), Italian painter and architect who worked in Vicenza and Venice
 Bartolomeo Montalbano (c. 1598–before 1651), Venetian Baroque composer
 Bartolomeo Nazari (1693–1758), Italian painter of the late-Baroque period
 Bartolomeo Pacca (1756–1844), Italian Cardinal, scholar, and Vatican statesman
 Bartolomeo Pagano (1878–1947), Italian motion picture actor
 Bartolomeo Panizza (1785–1867), Italian anatomist and surgeon
 Bartolomeo Passarotti (1529–1592), Italian painter of the mannerist period
 Bartolomeo Pinelli (1771–1835), Italian illustrator and engraver
 Bartolomeo Platina (1421–1481), Italian teacher, scholar, author, and member of the College of Abbreviators
 Bartolomeo Prignano (1318–1389), Pope Urban VI 1378–1389
 Bartolomeo Ruspoli (1697–1741), Italian cardinal, Knight of Malta
 Bartolomeo Sanvito (1435–1518), scribe from Padua, trained in Rome; master of Humanist italic script
 Bartolomeo Scala (1430–1497), Italian politician, author, and historian
 Bartolomeo Scappi (c. 1500–1577), Renaissance chef, served Popes Pius IV and Pius V from the Vatican kitchen
 Bartolomeo Schedoni (1578–1615), Italian early Baroque painter of Reggio Emilia
 Bartolomeo Sinibaldi a.k.a. Baccio da Montelupo (1469–c. 1523), sculptor of the Italian Renaissance period
 Bartolomeo Suardi a.k.a. Bramantino (c. 1456–c. 1530), Italian painter and architect in Milano
 Bartolomeo Trinci (d. 1421), Italian nobleman, lord of Foligno 1415–21
 Bartolomeo Tromboncino (1470–1535 or later), Italian composer of the middle Renaissance period; infamous for murdering his wife
 Bartolomeo Trosylho (1500–1567), Portuguese composer of the Renaissance period
 Bartolomeo Vanzetti (of Sacco and Vanzetti) (1888–1927), Italian immigrant convicted and executed for murder in Massachusetts, USA
 Bartolomeo Veneto (1502–1546), Italian painter who worked in Venice
 Bartolomeo Vivarini (c. 1432–c. 1499), Italian painter
 Bartolomeo Zaccaria (d. 1334), Italian nobleman, Margrave of Bodonitsa, Lord of Damala
 Fra Bartolomeo (1472–1517), also known as Bartolommeo di S. Marco, Bartolommeo di Pagholo, and Bacchio della Porta, an Italian Renaissance painter
 Santo Bartolomeo Quadri (1919–2008), Italian prelate of Roman Catholic Church

See also 
 
 
 
 Bartholomew and its diminutive Bart

References 

Italian masculine given names